Alexander Parker (August 1832 – October 2, 1900) was a United States Navy sailor and a recipient of the United States military's highest decoration, the Medal of Honor.

Born in August 1832 in Kensington, New Jersey, Parker joined the Navy from that state. On that day, at Mare Island Naval Shipyard in California, he attempted to save a shipmate from drowning. For this action, he was awarded the Medal of Honor two weeks later, on August 9.

Parker's official Medal of Honor citation reads:
For gallant conduct in attempting to save a shipmate from drowning at the Navy Yard, Mare Island, Calif., on 25 July 1876.

Parker left the Navy while still a boatswain's mate. He died on October 2, 1900, at age 68 and was buried at Mare Island Cemetery in Vallejo, California.

See also

List of Medal of Honor recipients during peacetime

References

External links
 

1832 births
1900 deaths
People from New Jersey
United States Navy sailors
United States Navy Medal of Honor recipients
Non-combat recipients of the Medal of Honor
Military personnel from Vallejo, California